The African-American LGBT community, otherwise referred to as the Black LGBT community, is part of the overall LGBT culture and overall African-American culture. The initialism LGBT stands for lesbian, gay, bisexual, and transgender. A landmark event for the LGBT community, and the Black LGBT community in particular, was the Stonewall uprising in 1969, in New York City's Greenwich Village, where Black activists including Stormé DeLarverie (who instigated the uprising) and Marsha P. Johnson (who was in the vanguard of the later pushback against the police) played key roles in the events.

Following Stonewall, the 1996 legal precedent Romer v. Evans also had a major impact. Ruling in favor of Romer, Justice Kennedy asserted in the case commentary that Colorado's state constitutional amendment denying LGBT people protection from discrimination "bore no purpose other than to burden LGB persons". Advancements in public policy, social discourse, and public knowledge have assisted in the progression and coming out of many Black LGBT individuals. Statistics show an increase in accepting attitudes towards lesbians and gays among general society. A Gallup survey shows that acceptance rates went from 38% in 1992 to 52% in 2001. However, when looking at the LGBT community through a racial lens, the Black community lacks many of these advantages.

Research and studies are limited for the Black LGBT community. Reasons given are resistance to coming out, as well as a lack of responses in surveys and research studies. The coming out rate of Black LGBT people is less than that of White LGBT people. The African-American population who identifies as LGBT are often considered to be a community of marginalized individuals who are further marginalized within their own broader community. Surveys and research have shown that 80% of African-Americans say gays and lesbians endure discrimination compared to the 61% of White Americans. Black members of the LGBT community are not only seen as "other" due to their race, but also due to their sexuality, so they always had to face both racism and homophobia.

History

Before Stonewall
The first African-American person known to describe himself as a drag queen was William Dorsey Swann, born enslaved in Hancock, Maryland. Swann was the first American on record who pursued legal and political action to defend the LGBT community's right to assemble. During the 1880s and 1890s, Swann organized a series of drag balls in Washington, D.C. Swann was arrested in police raids numerous times, including in the first documented case of arrests for female impersonation in the United States, on April 12, 1888.

Trans woman Lucy Hicks Anderson, born in 1886 in Waddy, Kentucky, lived her life serving as a domestic worker in her teen years, eventually becoming a socialite and madame in Oxnard, California, during the 1920s and 1930s. In 1945, she was tried in Ventura County for perjury and fraud for receiving spousal allotments from the military, as her dressing and presenting as a woman was considered masquerading. She lost this case but avoided a lengthy jail sentence, only to be tried again by the federal government shortly thereafter. She too lost this case, but she and her husband were sentenced to jail time. After serving their sentences, Lucy and her then husband, Ruben Anderson, relocated to Los Angeles, where they lived quietly until her death in 1954.

Harlem Renaissance
During the Harlem Renaissance, a subculture of LGBT African-American artists and entertainers emerged, including people like Alain Locke, Countee Cullen, Langston Hughes, Claude McKay, Wallace Thurman, Richard Bruce Nugent, Bessie Smith, Ma Rainey, Moms Mabley, Mabel Hampton, Alberta Hunter, and Gladys Bentley. Places like Savoy Ballroom and the Rockland Palace hosted drag-ball extravaganzas with prizes awarded for the best costumes. Langston Hughes depicted the balls as "spectacles of color". George Chauncey, author of Gay New York: Gender, Urban Culture, and the Making of the Gay Male World, 1890–1940, wrote that during this period "perhaps nowhere were more men willing to venture out in public in drag than in Harlem".

The Spark of the Stonewall Riot 
The Stonewall riots began when butch lesbian Stormé DeLarverie fought back against the police who were violently brutalizing her. She was very adamant on not allowing the police to discriminate against LGBT people, especially anyone who she considered her family, specifically butch lesbians and street kids. She walked around with a hidden rifle and referred to herself as the “guardian of the lesbians in The Village.” Even as an octogenarian she still felt it was her civic duty to protect anyone who she felt was in danger of being brutalized by the police. Often times they would arrest people for violating the "three piece rule." A common law cited during arrests was “three articles,” meaning that an individual had to be wearing at least three items of clothing that matched their assigned sex at birth. The police used these as grounds to arrest trans people on multiple occasions. It was still an active law up until recently in 2011 when it was finally repealed. DeLarverie was constantly being arrested for "impersonation of a male" because she was always dressed in masculine presenting clothing. During the ’50s and ’60s, any hint of homosexuality or gender deviance was grounds for arrest, losing your job and often your life. Stormé DeLarverie was a Black/biracial singer, drag king and MC, originally born and raised in New Orleans. She started singing in New Orleans clubs at 15, and soon after began touring around Europe, eventually landing in New York City and hosted at the Apollo Theater. After the uprising was underway, African-American drag queens Marsha P. Johnson and Zazu Nova were "in the vanguard" of the pushback against the police.

LGBT African Americans and Latinos were among the protestors, notably the LGBT youth and young adults who slept in nearby Christopher Park.

Post-Stonewall riot
In 1979, the Lambda Student Alliance (LSA) was established at Howard University.  It was the first openly black LGBT organization on a college campus.

In 1983, after a battle over LGB participation in the 20th anniversary March on Washington, a group of African-American leaders endorsed a national gay rights bill and put Audre Lorde from the National Coalition of Black Gays as speaker on the agenda. In 1984, Rev. Jesse Jackson included LGB people as part of his Rainbow/PUSH.

In 1989, Kimberlé Crenshaw coined the term "intersectionality," in order to show how different aspects of one's identity, including race, sexuality, gender, etc., combine to affect their life.

In 1993, Dr. William F. Gibson, national Chairman of the Board of NAACP, endorsed the March on Washington for Lesbian, Gay and Bi Equal Rights and Liberation and also supported repealing the ban on LGB service in the military.

On February 2, 2009, the first episode of RuPaul's Drag Race aired, normalizing and promoting drag, and winning many awards.

On May 19, 2012, the NAACP passed a resolution in support of same-sex marriage. That same month and year, President Obama became the first sitting president to openly support same-sex marriage.

In 2013, the Black Lives Matter movement was established by three black women, two of whom identify as queer. From its inception, the founders of Black Lives Matter have always put black LGBT voices at the center of the conversation.

In 2017, Moonlight, a black queer centric film, won several highly acclaimed awards.

In 2018, the critically acclaimed TV show Pose premiered, which is the first to feature a predominately people of color LGBT cast on a mainstream channel.

In 2019, Atlanta's mayor Keisha Lance Bottoms became the first elected official to establish and host an annual event recognizing and celebrating the black LGBT community. Also in 2019, Spelman College which is part of the Atlanta University Center, became the first historically black college or university to fund a chair in queer studies.  The endowed chair is named after civil rights activist and famed poet Audre Lorde and backed by a matching gift of $2 million from philanthropist Jon Stryker. And also in 2019, Chicago's mayor Lori Lightfoot became the first openly queer black person elected to lead a major city.

In 2020, Ritchie Torres and Mondaire Jones became the first openly queer black members of the United States Congress.

Cultural

Ball culture 

"Ball culture", "drag ball culture", the "house-ballroom community", the "ballroom scene"or "ballroom culture" describes a young African-American and Latin American underground LGBT subculture that originated in New York City, in which people "walk" (i.e., compete) for trophies, prizes, and glory at events known as balls. Ball culture consists of events that mix performance, dance, lip-syncing, and modeling. Attendees dance, vogue, walk, pose, and support one another in numerous drag and performance competition categories. Categories are designed to simultaneously epitomize and satirize various genders and social classes, while also offering an escape from reality.

The culture extends beyond the extravagant events as many participants in ball culture also belong to groups known as "houses," a longstanding tradition in LGBT communities, where chosen families of friends live in households together, forming relationships and community to replace families of origin from which they may be estranged.

Down-low 

In the United States, down-low is an African-American slang term specifically used within the African-American community that typically refers to a subculture of Black men who usually identify as heterosexual but actively seek sexual encounters and relations with other men, practice gay cruising, and frequently adopt a specific hip-hop attire during these activities. They avoid sharing this information even if they have female sexual partner(s), they are married to a woman, or they are single.  Some even publicly surround themselves with excessive amounts of females in order to cover up their true sexual identity.   The term is also used to refer to a related sexual identity. Down-low has been viewed as "a type of impression management that some of the informants use to present themselves in a manner that is consistent with perceived norms about masculine attribute, attitudes, and behavior".

Kiki 

A "Kiki" is a get-together of friends for gossiping and chit-chat.

Black gay pride 

Several major cities across the nation host black gay pride events focused on uplifting and celebrating the black LGBT community and culture.  The two largest are Atlanta Black Pride and D.C. Black Pride.

Voguing 

Voguing is a style of dance that arose from Harlem ballroom cultures, as danced by African-American and Latino gay/trans people, from the early 1960s through the 1980s. The drag competitions that began during this time eventually shifted from elaborate pageantry to vogue dance battles. Inspired by the style of Ancient Egyptian Hieroglyphs and the famous images of models in Vogue magazine, voguing is characterized by striking a series of poses as if one is modeling for a photo shoot. Arm and leg movements are angular, linear, rigid, and move swiftly from one static position to another.

Dance competitions often involved throwing "shade," or subtle insults directed at one another in order to impress the judges and the audience. The competition style was originally called "presentation" and later "performance." Over the years, the dance evolved into the more intricate and acrobatic form that is now called "vogue".

Persecution inside the Black community 

It has been asserted that the African-American community is largely homophobic. Reasons for this include the image young, black males are expected to convey in the public sphere; that homosexuality is seen as antithetical to being black in the African-American community; and the high association of the African-American community with the church in the United States.

African Americans disagree with LGBT civil liberties more than their white counterparts; some theorize this is because of conservative churches' role in advocating for African-American civil liberties and that this advocacy has expanded into the LGBT population. African-American LGBT people tend to identify more with their racial/ethnic category rather than their sexual orientation as a main identity reference group. Black LGBT people are often hesitant about revealing their sexuality to their friends and families because of homosexuality's incompatibility with cultural gender roles.

Religion 
In addition to facing discrimination for being black from outside their racial community, Black LGBTQ people have to deal with discrimination for being LGBTQ from inside their religious community, a.k.a the black church. The black church is often noted as a pillar of the black community.

Due to the history of slavery in the United States, black people were often denied the freedom to choose their sexual partners. Sticking to these heteronormative ideas set by slave owners fostered a notion of “respectability politics”. Specifically, to be respected, one must not stray from typical gender and sexuality. Additionally, the black church continued to emphasize heterosexual marriage. Despite the emphasis of "personal freedom and social justice" in the black church, members tend to stick to this conservative family view, which is "linked to intolerance of gays and lesbians".

Studies have found that Black LGBTQ individuals raised around homophobic themes developed increased internalized homonegativity. Additionally, being exposed to homophobic imagery impacts the mental development of Black LGBTQ youth.

Education 
Education has an impact on homophobic attitudes and views of sexuality within the Black community. This follows a nationwide trend; more educated people are likely to be more accepting of non-heterosexual sexuality. Better education typically means less affiliation to conservative religions or denominations, which limits the influence of socially conservative ideas.

Barack Obama acknowledged homophobia within the African-American community and said; "If we are honest with ourselves, we'll acknowledge that our own community has not always been true to Martin Luther King's vision of a beloved community ... We have scorned our gay brothers and sisters instead of embracing them".

Hip-hop 

Hip hop has long been one of the least LGBT-friendly genres of music, with a significant body of the genre containing homophobic views and anti-gay lyrics. Attitudes towards homosexuality in hip hop culture have historically been negative. Gay slurs like "no homo", and "pause" can be heard in hip hop lyrics from the industry's biggest stars. According to the Los Angeles Times, these slurs were used to put "queerness as a punchline". Artists like Lil Nas X and Kevin Abstract have been changing the face of hip-hop to make it more inclusive. On March 9, 2021, Lil Nas X released the song and music video for the song "Montero." Both the song and music video depict the struggles of being gay while within a homophobic culture and society.

Economic disparities
The current federal law, that is enforced by the Equal Employment Opportunity Commission, prohibits employment discrimination. The federal law specifies no discrimination because of race, color, religion, sex, national origin, age, disability, or genetic information. The current federal law does not specify sexual orientation. There is legislation currently being proposed to congress known as the ENDA (Employment Non-Discrimination Act) that would include hindering discrimination based on sexual orientation, too. Most recently, the Equality Act would do this as well. However, current policies do not protect sexual orientation and affect the employment rates as well as LGBT individual's incomes and overall economic status. The Black population in the United States of America as of the 2010 consensus is 14,129,983 people. Out of that, it is estimated that 4.60 percent of the black population identify as LGBT.

Within the Black LGBT community many face economic disparities and discrimination. Statistically black LGBT individuals are more likely to be unemployed than their non-black counterparts. According to the Williams Institute, the vast difference lies in the survey responses of "not in workforce" from different populations geographically. Black LGBT individuals, nonetheless, face the dilemma of marginalization in the job market. As of 2013, same-sex couples' income is lower than those in heterosexual relationships with an average of $25,000 income.

For opposite-sex couples, statistics show a $1,700 increase. Analyzing economic disparities on an intersectional level (gender and race), a black man is likely to receive a higher income than a woman. For men, statistics shows approximately a $3,000 increase from the average income for all black LGBT identified individuals, and a $6,000 increase in salary for same-sex male couples.

Female same-sex couples receive $3,000 less than the average income for all black LGBT individuals and approximately $6,000 less than their male counterparts. (Look at Charts below) The income disparity amongst black LGBT families affects the lives of their dependents, contributing to poverty rates. Children growing up in low-income households are more likely to remain in the poverty cycle. Due to economic disparities in the black LGBT community, 32% of children raised by gay black men are in poverty. However, only 13% of children raised by heterosexual black parents are in poverty and only 7% for white heterosexual parents.

Comparatively looking at gender, race, and sexual orientation, black women same-sex couples are likely to face more economic disparities than black women in an opposite sex relationship. Black women in same-sex couples earn $42,000 compared to black women in opposite-sex relationships who earn $51,000, a twenty-one percent increase in income. Economically, black women same-sex couples are also less likely to be able to afford housing. Approximately fifty percent of black women same-sex couples can afford to buy housing compared to white women same-sex couples who have a seventy-two percent rate in home ownership.

Black transgender people 
Black transgender individuals face higher rates of discrimination than black gay, lesbian and bisexual individuals. While policies have been implemented to inhibit discrimination based on gender identity, transgender individuals of color lack legal support. Transgender individuals are still not supported by legislation and policies like the wider LGBT community is. New reports show vast discrimination to the black transgender community. Reports show in the National Transgender Discrimination Survey that black transgender individuals, along with gender non-conforming individuals, have high rates of poverty.

Statistics shows a 34% rate of households receiving an income less than $10,000 a year. According to the data, that is twice the rate when looking at transgender individuals of all races and four times higher than the general black population. Many face poverty due to discrimination and bias when trying to purchase a home or apartment. 38% of black trans individuals report in the Discrimination Survey being turned down property due to their gender identity. 31% of the black individuals were evicted due to their identity.

Violence 

Black transgender individuals also face disparities in education, employment, and health. In education, black transgender and non-conforming persons face brutish environments while attending school. Reporting rates show 49% of black transgender individuals being harassed from kindergarten to twelfth grade. Physical assault rates are at 27% percent, and sexual assault is at 15%. These drastically high rates have an effect on the mental health of black transgender individuals.

As a result of high assault/harassment and discrimination, suicide rates are at the same rate (49%) as harassment to black transgender individuals. Employment discrimination rates are similarly higher. Statistics show a 26% rate of unemployed black transgender and non-conforming persons. Many black trans people have lost their jobs or have been denied jobs due to gender identity: 32% are unemployed, and 48% were denied jobs.

Black lesbian culture and identity

Black lesbian identity 
There has historically been a lot of racism and racial segregation in lesbian spaces. Racial and class divisions sometimes made it difficult for black and white women to see themselves as on the same side in the feminist movement. Black women faced misogyny from within the black community even during the fight for black liberation. Homophobia was also pervasive in the black community during the Black Arts Movement because "feminine" homosexuality was seen as undermining black power.

Black lesbians especially struggled with the stigma they faced within their own community. With unique experiences and often very different struggles, black lesbians have developed an identity that is more than the sum of its parts – black, lesbian, and woman. Some individuals may rank their identities separately, seeing themselves as black first, woman second, lesbian third, or some other permutation of the three; others see their identities as inextricably interwoven.

Gender roles and presentation 
The gender relations perspective is a sociological theory which proposes that gender is not just a state of being but rather a system of behavior created through interactions with others, generally to fill various necessary social roles. Same-sex-attracted individuals are just as impacted by the societally reinforced need for these 'gendered' roles as heterosexuals are. Within black lesbian communities, gender presentation is often used to indicate the role an individual can be expected to take in a relationship, though many may also simply prefer the presentation for its own sake, assigning less significance to its association with certain behaviors or traits. According to sociologist Mignon Moore, because black lesbians generally existed "outside" of the predominantly white feminist movement of the 1960s and 70s, the community was less affected by the non-black lesbian community's increased emphasis on androgyne as a rejection of "heterosexual" gender norms.

Instead, they adapted the existing butch/femme dichotomy to form three main categories:

 The terms stud or aggressive (AG) was used to refer to more masculine-presenting lesbians. Stud fashion is generally more in-line with trends popular among black men, rather than the styles typical to non-black butches.
 Individuals now commonly called stems – whom Moore referred to as "gender blenders" – differed from androgynous lesbians by combining aspects of both masculinity and femininity instead of de-emphasizing them.
 Black fems were generally more consistent with white femmes in their feminine expression, though in the modern day, their styles also often align more with the fashion of other black women.

Health disparities 

Black LGBT individuals face many health risks due to discriminatory policies and behaviors in medicine. Due to lack of medical coverage and adequate medical treatment, many are faced with heath risks. There is no current legislation fully protecting LGBT individuals from discrimination in the public sphere concerning health care. President Barack Obama has recently written a memo to the Department of Health and Human Services to enact regulations on discrimination of gay and transgender individuals receiving Medicare and Medicaid, as well as to permit full hospital visitation rights to same-sex couples and their families. The United States of Housing and Urban Development proposed policies that would allow access and eligibility to core programs regardless of sexual orientation and gender identity. The Affordable Care Act (ACA) is currently working to be inclusive, as courts have recently passed interpretation of the ACA to prohibit discrimination against transgender individuals and gender non-conforming persons.

HIV/AIDS 
One of the greatest concerns in the Black LGBT community is sexually transmitted diseases, and one of the greatest STDs affecting the Black community is HIV/AIDS. Black people account for 44% of new HIV infections in both adults and adolescents. Black women account for 29% of new HIV infections. For black LGBT male-identified individuals, 70% of the population accounts for new HIV infections for both adults and adolescents. The rates of HIV for black LGBT men are higher than their non-black counterparts. One of the major factors that contributes to higher rates of STDs like HIV/AIDS is lack of medical access. Rather than a high prevalence of condomless sex, it is caused by a high distrust of antiretroviral therapy in non-white communities.

Mental Health 
Black LGBTQ individuals are disproportionately affected by mental illness compared to other LGBTQ people. Black LGBTQ individuals are also more likely to experience poor mental health than Black heterosexual people. Although researchers have stated a need for more research in this area, several studies have shown links between the minority stress that comes from belonging to these two marginalized groups and mental illnesses such as anxiety or depression.

This occurs for reasons such as difficulty navigating their communities and similarly a lack of acceptance. Research tends to show that the less social support Black LGBTQ individuals receive, the higher chance that they will report symptoms of depression. Additionally, LGB Black people reported higher rates of "suicidal ideation, suicide planning and substance use than Black heterosexual participants.” These trends were observed even stronger for emerging adults in the Black LGBTQ community, as they have to cope with the stress of adulthood along with their sexual and racial identity.  Research also suggests a link between general and cyber based victimisation in these low mental health outcomes for young Black LGBTQ people.

In addition to being disproportionately affected by mental illnesses, Black LGBTQ people were among the least likely to pursue mental health services. This was due to multiple factors such as care providers’ lack of proficiency in treating patients with sexual identity and racial identity struggles. Additionally, due to these disparities being rooted in systematic racism, large-scale “structural and systematic interventions” are needed to address these poor mental health outcomes.

Depiction in popular culture 
African-American LGBT culture has been depicted in films such as Patrick Ian Polk's Noah's Arc and Punks, Dee Rees' Pariah, and Barry Jenkins' Moonlight, which not only has the main character as a gay African-American but is written by an African American and is based on a play by black gay playwright Tarell Alvin McCraney.

In 2018, the critically acclaimed TV show Pose premiered. It is the first to feature a predominately people of color LGBT cast on a mainstream channel.

Organizations 

See also: Category: African-American LGBT organizations

Some notable people

Gay and bisexual men 
 Jonathan Capehart
DeRay McKesson
Tevin Campbell
Colman Domingo
 Taylor Bennett
 E. Lynn Harris
 Bayard Rustin
 Glenn Burke
 Johnny Mathis
 Keith Boykin
 Darrin P. Gayles
 Countee Cullen
Ryan Jamaal Swain
Ritchie Torres
 Langston Hughes
 Wilson Cruz
 Alvin Ailey
 Larry Levan
 Frankie Knuckles
 Tony Humphries
 Billy Porter
 Karamo Brown
 Mel Tomlinson
Clark Moore
 Jason Collins
 Michael Sam
 Jussie Smollett
 iLoveMakonnen
 John Ameachi
 James Baldwin
 Paris Barclay
 Charles M. Blow
 Jericho Brown
 Lee Daniels
 Terrance Dean
 Anye Elite
Willi Smith
Michael Arceneaux
 David Hampton
 Marcellas Reynolds
 Ryan Russell
 LZ Granderson
 Essex Hemphill
 Langston Hughes
 Don Lemon
 Darryl Stephens
 Bruce Nugent
 Saeed Jones
 Tarell Alvin Mccraney
 Patrick Ian Polk
 Alain LeRoy Locke
 Frank Ocean
 Marlon Riggs
 Shaun T
 Harrison David Rivers
 RuPaul
 Justin Simien
Andrew Gillum
Joshua Johnson
 Daryl Stephens
 Sylvester
 Andrew Leon Talley
 Tyler The Creator
 Lil Nas X
 Wentworth Miller
 Saucy Santana
 Kevin Abstract

Lesbian and bisexual women 
Ariana DeBose
Candace Parker
Sha'Carri Richardson
Niecy Nash
Deborah Batts
Miss Cleo
Lori Lightfoot
Tessa Thompson
Barbara Jordan
Willow Smith
Raven-Symoné
Tyra Bolling
Brittney Griner
Seimone Augustus
Angel McCoughtry
Samira Wiley
Young M.A.
Robin Roberts
Barbara Jordan
E. Denise Simmons
Da Brat
Karine Jean-Pierre
Josephine Baker
Octavia Butler
Gladys Bentley
Angela Davis
Lorraine Hansberry
Mabel Hampton
Audre Lorde
Meshell Ndegeocello
Ma Rainey
Monifah
Moms Mabley
Wanda Sykes
Lena Waithe
Rebecca Walker
Nell Carter
Ethel Waters
Alice Walker
Tracy Chapman
Mimi Faust
Bessie Smith
Janelle Monáe
Kehlani
Amber Rose
Alice Dunbar Nelson
Azealia Banks
Halsey (singer)
Cardi B
Angel Haze
Amandla Stenberg
Felicia Pearson
Doja Cat

Pansexual 
 Janelle Monáe
Bob the Drag Queen
Angel Haze

Transgender 
Amiyah Scott
Angelica Ross
Dominique Jackson
 Patricio Manuel
 Kye Allums
 Laverne Cox
 Ts Madison
 Sir Lady Java
 Isis King
 Cece Mcdonald
 Janet Mock
 Kortney Ryan Ziegler
 MJ Rodriguez
 Mykki Blanco
 Brian Michael Smith
 Kat Blaque

Gender non-conforming 
 Ryann Holmes
 Marsha P. Johnson
 Saucy Santana
 Pauli Murray

Some first African-American LGBT holders of political offices in the United States

State legislature (partial list)

Rhode Island
 Gordon Fox (D) 
 1st gay African-American member of the Rhode Island General Assembly
 1st gay African-American Speaker of the Rhode Island House of Representatives
 1st gay African-American member of the Rhode Island House of Representatives from the 4th and 5th district

Georgia
 Rashad Taylor (D) 
 1st gay African-American member of the Georgia General Assembly 
 1st gay African-American member of the Georgia House of Representatives from the 55th district

Massachusetts
 Althea Garrison (R) 
 1st transgender woman African American member of the Massachusetts General Court 
 1st transgender woman African American of the Massachusetts House of Representatives from the 5th Suffolk District

Nevada
 Pat Spearman (D) 
 1st lesbian African American member of the Nevada Legislature and 1st lesbian African American member of the Nevada Senate from the 1st district

North Carolina
 Marcus Brandon (D) 
 1st gay African-American member of the North Carolina General Assembly and 1st gay African-American member of the North Carolina House of Representatives from the 60th district

Texas
 Barbara Jordan 
 1st African American woman to serve in the Texas House of Representatives  (1966)

Mayoral

California 
 Ron Oden (D) 
 1st gay African-American United States mayor and 1st gay African American mayor of Palm Springs, California

New Jersey 
 Bruce Harris (R) 
 1st gay African-American mayor of Chatham Borough, New Jersey

Legislative

New York 
 Keith St. John (D) 
 1st gay African-American public office holder 
 1st gay African-American member of the Albany Common Council Alderman of the 2nd ward

Judicial

Federal
 Darrin P. Gayles (D) 
 1st gay African-American male United States federal judge 
 1st gay African-American United States District Court for the Southern District of Florida

Works 
Black is... Black Ain't
Paris Is Burning
How Do I Look
Mississippi Damned

See also

House music
J-Setting
Homophobia in ethnic minority communities
Racism in the LGBT community
Timeline of African and diasporic LGBT history
Black lesbian literature
UK Black Pride
Down-low (sexual slang)
Media and LGBT youth of colour in the United States
Atlanta Black Pride
Dallas Black Pride

General:
LGBT in the United States

References

 
LGBT in the United States
LGBT topics in the African diaspora